Megan Hollingshead, also known as Karen Thompson or Kelli Kassidi is an American voice actress, best known for her roles as Nurse Joy in Pokémon, Mai Valentine in Yu-Gi-Oh!, Shizune in Naruto, Caster in Fate/stay night, Rangiku Matsumoto in Bleach, and Re-l Mayer in Ergo Proxy.

Career
Best known for her anime dubbing work, Megan's most famous roles include Nurse Joy, Cassidy in the first 6 seasons of the Pokémon anime series and Mai Valentine in the first 3 seasons of Yu-Gi-Oh! Duel Monsters. She also lent her voice to the Enix role-playing game series Valkyrie Profile as Lenneth. During the start of Pokémon's 7th season, she left New York City to relocate to her current residence in Los Angeles, and continue her voice acting career, voicing characters such as Shizune in Naruto and Naruto Shippuden, Rangiku Matsumoto and Nemu Kurotsuchi in Bleach, Hilda in Eureka Seven, Villetta Nu in the Code Geass series, and Re-l Mayer in Ergo Proxy. Megan's theatre résumé is as extensive, if less so, with roles in performances of The Duchess of Malfi, Baptizing Adam, Spacegrrrls, and Vinegar Tom, to name but a few. Megan studied acting at the William Esper Studio, and is a founding member of the Adirondack Theatre Festival. She serves as a yoga instructor in her spare time.

Filmography

Anime

Animation

Film

Video games 

==Notes==

References

External links
 
 
 
 Megan Hollingshead at the CrystalAcids Anime Voice Actor Database
 

1968 births
American video game actresses
American voice actresses
Living people
Actresses from New York City
American stage actresses
20th-century American actresses
21st-century American actresses
Actresses from Los Angeles